Jacques Vanderstappen (1 September 1930 – 2016) was a Belgian field hockey player. He competed at the 1952, 1956, 1960 and the 1964 Summer Olympics.

References

External links
 

1930 births
2016 deaths
Belgian male field hockey players
Olympic field hockey players of Belgium
Field hockey players at the 1952 Summer Olympics
Field hockey players at the 1956 Summer Olympics
Field hockey players at the 1960 Summer Olympics
Field hockey players at the 1964 Summer Olympics
People from Ixelles
Field hockey players from Brussels